Byron Nelson High School is a public high school located in Trophy Club, Texas about  north of Fort Worth, Texas, in Denton County and opened in August 2009 for the 09–10 school year. It is the second high school in the Northwest Independent School District. The school cost $86.5 million dollars to build. The academic wing seats a 700-seat cafeteria with a mall-style food court serving layout. It is built along the property of the Army Corps of Engineers, along the edge of where Denton Creek flows into Lake Grapevine at the lake's southwestern corner. In 2013, the school was rated "Met Standard" by the Texas Education Agency. In 2019, Byron Nelson High School earned an "A" according to TEA's school accountability rating system.

Byron Nelson, which competes as a UIL class 6A school, has been a 4-year campus since the 2011–2012 academic year. The campus features environmentally-conscious design elements such as low-energy light fixtures, a landscape designed to conserve water, and the incorporation of recycled building materials sourced from local suppliers.  Students have access to a variety of restaurants, including Grille Works, Asian/Italian Restaurant, Mexican Restaurant, and a coffee shop.

Campus
It has a coffeeshop called Java City.

Feeder schools
Medlin Middle School
Lakeview Elementary School
Beck Elementary School
Roanoke Elementary School
John M. Tidwell Middle School
Cox Elementary School
Hughes Elementary School
Granger Elementary School

Namesake
The school is named in honor of the late Byron Nelson, a heralded professional golfer who lived on a ranch in what would be the feeder zone for the school today near the neighboring town of Roanoke, Texas.

Athletics
The Byron Nelson Bobcats compete in a variety of individual and team sports.

On campus training facilities for athletes include three gymnasiums in the main building, outdoor tennis courts, an indoor partial football field (60 yards long) with artificial surface, two outdoor football fields with artificial surfaces, a baseball stadium with adjacent bullpens, a softball stadium with adjacent bullpens, a concession stand with restrooms, and a field house with locker rooms, meeting rooms, and training rooms (sports rehabilitation), and weight rooms. Athletic teams also train and compete at district-owned facilities such as the aquatic center and Northwest ISD stadium.

UIL Athletic Program State Titles

Basketball (Men)
Notable seasons:
2010-2011 Qualified for playoffs

Cheerleading
Notable Seasons:
2019(6A) 3rd Place
2020(6A) 2nd Place
2021(6A) 1st Place

Ladies Soccer
Notable seasons:
2011–2012 State 6A Finalist; 2nd place finish
2013–2014 State 6A Quarter-Finalist

Men's Soccer
Notable seasons:
2010-2011 District Runner Up; qualified for playoffs
2012-2013 District Champions 
2013-2014 6A State Champions

Varsity Football
The Byron Nelson varsity football team hosts home games at Northwest ISD stadium in Justin, Texas.

Golf
Notable seasons

Women: 
2012-2013 4A State Champions

Fine Arts 
In May 2020, it was announced that the 2019-2020 Byron Nelson Symphony Orchestra was invited to perform at the prestigious Midwest International Band & Orchestra clinic in Chicago, Illinois. The orchestra is composed of the top string, woodwind, brass and percussion students from both the band and orchestra programs.  The ensemble is under the direction of Gary Keller, director of orchestras, and Jed Weeks, director of bands.  The symphony orchestra was formed in 2012 and has received UIL Sweepstakes Awards for the past eight years.

Marching Band

Clubs and organizations
Byron Nelson is home to many different clubs and organizations. Students participate in band, choir, orchestra, speech and debate, National Honor Society, Student Council, yearbook, Lynx Leaders, and many more extracurricular activities.

The Speech and Debate team sent 5 students to the national finals in June 2011. They also had 10 Regional Qualifiers and 14 State Qualifiers. The school had students place 2nd and 4th in events at UIL 4A State. For the 2011–2012 school year, the team had 24 state bids, 2 UIL State Champions, 1 UIL 2nd Place finisher, and 1 UIL 5th-place finisher, making the speech and debate team the 4A UILState Champions overall. They also had 2 students attend the 2012 National Forensic League National Championship in Indianapolis, Indiana, placing 6th in the nation in Public Forum Debate. In 2014, the team had one student win the state title in two events, a 3rd-place finisher, and two other finalists in the state competition, making the team again the overall 4A UIL State Champion squad.

Notable events

Allegedly improper suspension 
Byron Nelson has made national news when school administrators decided to suspend a 16-year-old student. The student exhibited red and watery eyes, a sign, according to  school policy that a student has been smoking cannabis. However, the young man was grieving over the murder of his father two days prior. Teachers had been notified of the death. Despite this, the school informed the student's mother that he would need to take a drug test in order to come back to school. She also would need to file a complaint to have the suspension removed from his record.

Bomb threat 
On the afternoon of January 30, 2017, a female student called in a bomb threat stating that she had a bomb strapped to her, was armed with a gun, and had planted a bomb in one of the athletic locker rooms. The school was placed in immediate lockdown, and, as a precaution, Medlin Middle School, Beck Elementary School, and Lakeview Elementary School were also put on lockdown for a short time. BNHS was on lockdown until 6:30 p.m., at which time police determined it was safe to lift the lockdown. Police requested that students leave their backpacks in the building and cars in the parking lot to be searched. Students were only allowed to bring their phone, wallet, and any keys they had. Students were escorted to Medlin Middle School by walking across the practice fields in straight uniform lines and got on a bus or were picked up by parents at the school. Police searched until midnight for any bombs, but found none. On January 31, 2017, the attendance percentage was 67%, down from an average of 94%. The female student who called in the bomb threat was arrested and charged with a felony. Another male student was also arrested.

References

External links
Northwest Independent School District

Northwest Independent School District high schools
High schools in Denton County, Texas
Educational institutions established in 2009
2009 establishments in Texas